Matt Bucknor (born June 30, 1985) is a professional Canadian football cornerback for the BC Lions of the Canadian Football League (CFL). He was signed as an undrafted free agent by the Hamilton Tiger-Cats on May 30, 2012 and played for the club for two years before being traded to the Winnipeg Blue Bombers. He was released by the Blue Bombers on June 18, 2016. He signed with the Lions on February 16, 2017. He played CIS Football for the Windsor Lancers.

References

External links
Winnipeg Blue Bombers bio

1985 births
Living people
Sportspeople from Hamilton, Ontario
Canadian football defensive backs
Windsor Lancers football players
Hamilton Tiger-Cats players
Winnipeg Blue Bombers players
Calgary Stampeders players
BC Lions players
Players of Canadian football from Ontario